The name Reming was used for eleven tropical cyclones in the Philippines by the Philippine Atmospheric, Geophysical and Astronomical Services Administration (PAGASA), and its predecessor, the Philippine Weather Bureau, in the Western Pacific Ocean.

 Tropical Depression Reming (1964) – a weak system which was only tracked by the Philippine Weather Bureau.
 Typhoon Mamie (1968) (T6825, 30W, Reming) – a minimal typhoon that crossed the Philippines and Vietnam.
 Tropical Depression Reming (1972) – a short-lived tropical depression which did not cause any damage.
 Typhoon Fran (1976) (T7617, 17W, Reming) – a powerful typhoon that made landfall in western Japan and became one of its wettest and most destructive typhoons, killing 169.
 Typhoon Norris (1980) (T8012, 13W, Reming) – a relatively strong typhoon that struck Taiwan.
 Severe Tropical Storm Warren (1984) (T8423, 26W, Reming) – an erratic system which peaked as a Category 1-equivalent tropical cyclone; significantly affected the Philippines despite staying offshore, causing 73 deaths. 
 Tropical Storm Reming (1988) – a tropical storm that was only recognized by PAGASA.
 Typhoon Elsie (1992) (T9228, 28W, Reming) – a very strong typhoon which affected no land areas.
 Tropical Depression Abel (1996) (30W, Reming) – a tropical depression considered by JTWC as a tropical storm; hit northern Philippines, claiming 8 lives and rendering 7 other people as missing.
 Typhoon Xangsane (2000) (T0020, 30W, Reming) – a destructive typhoon which killed 181 people in the Philippines and Taiwan, in addition to another 83 fatalities which came from a plane crash indirectly attributed to it.
 Typhoon Durian (2006) (T0621, 24W, Reming) – an intense typhoon that killed almost 1,400 people in the Philippines and another 98 individuals in Vietnam.

The name Reming was retired from use in the Philippine Area of Responsibility after the 2006 season and was replaced with Ruby, which was only used once by PAGASA (in 2014):

 Typhoon Hagupit (2014) (T1422, 22W, Ruby) – a strong, late-season typhoon which crossed the central regions of Philippines, causing 18 fatalities.

Like Reming, the name Ruby was also retired by PAGASA. It was replaced by Rosita, which was coincidentally only used once by the said meteorological bureau:

 Typhoon Yutu (2018) (T1826, 31W, Rosita) - another Category 5-equivalent super typhoon that gravely affected the Mariana Islands and the Philippines, causing hundreds of millions worth of damage and the loss of 30 lives.

The name Rosita was retired after 2018 and was replaced by Rosal, which was first used during the 2022 season.

 Tropical Storm Pakhar (2022) (T2225, 29W, Rosal) – late-season tropical storm which remained at sea.

Pacific typhoon set index articles